The Republic of North Peru was one of the three constituent republics of the short-lived Peru–Bolivian Confederation of 1836–1839.

North Peru was one of two states—the other being South Peru—that arose from the division of the Peruvian Republic due to the civil wars of 1834 and 1835 to 1836. The states were founded in 1836 to be constituent Republics of the planned Peru-Bolivian Confederation, alongside Bolivia.

The Confederation came to an end three years later after continuous border wars with Argentina and Chile in the War of the Confederation, and after a chaotic civil conflict between north and south Peruvians. In August of 1839, Agustín Gamarra declared the Confederation dissolved; as a result, South Peru and North Peru reverted to being a unified Republic of Peru.

History

Background

After political instability in Peru and a coup d'état in 1835, a civil war broke out between newly self-declared president Felipe Santiago Salaverry and constitutional president Luis José de Orbegoso, who allowed Bolivian president Andrés de Santa Cruz to send his troops through the Peruvian border. After the latter's triumph in 1836, assemblies were soon established to make way for the creation of the Confederation, an idea that had been floating around since the era of independence.

Establishment
A constituent assemby known as the Huaura Assembly was held from August 3 to 24, 1836, and featured representatives from La Libertad, Lima, Maynas and Junín. On August 11, North Peru was officially established through the promulgation of its constitution by the then President Orbegoso, naming Santa Cruz—who triumphantly entered Lima on August 15—as the Supreme Protector of the state. Orbegoso also presented his resignation, but it was not approved by the assembly, who named him provisional president. The assembly also established the new territorial divisions of the country. Unlike it's new southern neighbour, North Peru maintained the national symbols of its predecessor.

Provided, then, with all the legal elements granted by the assemblies of the three states, Santa Cruz decreed the establishment of the Peru-Bolivian Confederation, by decree given in Lima on October 28, 1836. The  was signed without debate during the congress. It established the legal framework through which the state would operate, and also included the design of the Confederation's flag. Reactions to the pact were mixed event among its signatories, and disagreements led to the establishment of one constituent congress per member state. The act was later promulgated in 1837.

Development and dissolution
The Confederation generated resistance among several groups in both countries, which resented the dilution of national identities, and also among neighbouring countries. An important number of Peruvian politicians who opposed the Confederation, such as Agustín Gamarra and Ramón Castilla, fled to Chile where they received support, leading to the War of the Confederation.

After a trade war, the Congress of Chile approved the declaration of war on December 26, 1836, claiming that Santa Cruz's rule over Peru was illegitimate, and that his influence threatened the integrity of other South American nations, as seen by Orbegoso's support for an attempted invasion of Chile by Ramón Freire, specifically pointing out that it targeted then minister Diego Portales. Argentina followed suit after Juan Manuel de Rosas then declared war on the Confederation on May 19, 1837, after the escalation of a territorial conflict in its border, accusing Santa Cruz of harboring supporters of the Unitarian Party. The accusations ended up being true, as Santa Cruz had financially supported the émigrés.

South Peru was invaded from October to November, with the occupants being surrounded and forced to sign the a treaty, leaving the country shortly after. The treaty was declared null and void by Chile, and a second expedition headed by Manuel Bulnes was organized, which left for Peru on July 19, 1838. Around the same time, North Peru seceded from the Confederation on July 30, but was nevertheless attacked and defeated by the second expedition in the Battle of Portada de Guías of August 21.

During this time, the Confederation's stability collapsed, as by September, Peru (i.e. North and South Peru) was under the de jure control of seven different presidents at one time, of which six claimed control over North Peru (with the exception of Pío de Tristán in South Peru): Santa Cruz, who was the Supreme Protector; Gamara, the restorationist president; Orbegoso, leader of the secessionist North Peruvian state; José de la Riva Agüero, who replaced Orbegoso, being appointed by Santa Cruz; Domingo Nieto, in the north; and Juan Francisco de Vidal in Huaylas.

Santa Cruz occupied Lima on November 10, ending the siege in Callao, but left for the north, where the restaurateurs were located. He was defeated in the Battle of Yungay on January 20, 1839, and thus, the Confederation was dissolved, with Gamarra announcing its dissolution on August 25. The Confederate defeat led to the exile of Santa Cruz, first to Guayaquil, in Ecuador, then to Chile, and finally to Europe, where he died.

Government
From 1837 until the confederation's dissolution, the state was controlled by a provisional president and a congress, both with limited powers and under the control of Marshal Andrés de Santa Cruz who was styled the supreme protector.

 First president: General Luis Orbegoso (21 August 1837 – 30 July 1838). He declared secession of the Republic of North Peru from the Peru-Bolivian Confederation on  but continued as Provisional President until 
 Second president: General José de la Riva Agüero (11 August 1838 – 24 January 1839)

See also 
Peru-Bolivian Confederation
War of the Confederation

References

Bibliography
 
 

Former countries in South America
Peru–Bolivian Confederation
War of the Confederation
States and territories established in 1836
States and territories disestablished in 1839
1836 establishments in South America
1839 disestablishments in South America
North Peru